Things is a 1989 Canadian independent direct-to-video horror film, directed by Andrew Jordan and written by Jordan and Barry J. Gillis. The film is considered one of the worst films of all time.

Plot 
Don and Fred decide to visit the house of Doug, Don's brother. They're unaware that Doug and his wife Susan have been participating in wild experiments in order to have a child. While they're looking for some beer the two men discover a book written by Aleister Crowley and a tape recorder, which plays strange sounds. Hearing the tape, Doug storms in and scolds them before joining them in their drinking. Meanwhile Susan gives birth to bizarre creatures before dying. These creatures then infest the house and attack the men. Fred disappears, leaving Don and Doug to fight the creatures. Don accidentally kills Doug while trying to hit a creature on his back; he is later shown revived, baffling Don before disappearing. Doug briefly re-appears with a chainsaw before also disappearing. Don runs into the doctor who was conducting the experiments on Susan, who accuses him of murdering everyone.  Don seemingly manages to escape the house. The film ends with the note "You have just experienced Things".

Production
Things is reportedly the "first Canadian shot-on-Super 8 gore shocker commercially released on VHS." Shot in the Toronto suburb of Scarborough, Ontario, the cast consisted of co-writer Barry J. Gillis and pornographic film star Amber Lynn. The plot follows two friends in a remote cabin who "discover a womb of monstrous horror that demands graphic dismemberment".

Release
In 1989, Things was released direct-to-video. It was released on DVD in 2008, and was re-released on home media in 2011. In 2021, Joe Bob Briggs hosted the film on The Last Drive-In With Joe Bob Briggs. The episode featuring the movie was subsequently released on VHS in 2022. It has also been featured at film festivals.

Reception and legacy
Since its release, Things has gained a reputation as being one of the worst films ever made. Critics from The Beachwood Reporter, Dread Central and Cinema Sewer each described it as being the worst film ever made. Adam Symchuk of Screen Rant writes: "While films like The Room and Birdemic seem to be constant contenders for the best 'so bad it's good' movie, [Things] is the true unheralded champion among many cinephiles." Likewise, a review from DVD Verdict wrote that the film was "a treasure for those who like to revel in the worst of the worst." Meanwhile, J Hurtado of Screen Anarchy described it as "critically unassailable" and Will Pfeifer opined that "It's so terrible I can’t think of another movie that even comes close."

Caelum Vatnsdal, author of They Came From Within: A History of Canadian Horror Cinema, wrote that Things is "the worst Canadian horror film ever made". In his book Spinegrinder: The Movies Most Critics Won't Write About, Clive Davies stated that, while Things was a strong contender for the title of "best worst movie", it is not well known outside of its cult following. Things was also reviewed by RedLetterMedia on an episode of Half in the Bag in 2013, and RiffTrax spoofed it on March 4, 2022, with the latter concluding that "It’s definitive, universal… the worst movie we’ve ever done".

References

External links
 Official website
 
 
 Excerpt of RiffTrax treatment on official YouTube channel

1989 films
Camcorder films
1989 direct-to-video films
1989 horror films
1980s exploitation films
1989 independent films
1980s monster movies
Canadian monster movies
Direct-to-video horror films
English-language Canadian films
Films shot in Ontario
1980s English-language films
Canadian direct-to-video films
1980s Canadian films